Lighthorne Heath is a village in the civil parish of Upper Lighthorne, in the Stratford-on-Avon District, in the county of Warwickshire, England. It is located some six miles to the south east of Leamington Spa and is very close to the M40 motorway.

History
The village was established in the 1950s, situated to the north of RAF Gaydon it housed the married airmen and officers (those unmarried lived in barracks). Before that time the site was just farmland between Gaydon and Lighthorne with a few isolated buildings. After just over thirty years of active service most of the smaller houses on the base were sold off to Stratford District Council between 1976 and 1981. Throughout the 1980s the larger houses were sold on the open market by the Ministry of Defence. The runway and RAF buildings were taken over in 1978 by British Leyland, and became a proving ground for its cars. This evolved into the Gaydon centre (where Land Rover has its headquarters) and the British Motor Museum, a museum of many British cars. More recently Aston Martin built a factory here for its car production.

A parish council was established in 2003. Before 2003 it shared a Parish Council with Lighthorne, a village 800m to the west. According to the 2011 Census Lighthorne Heath parish had a population of 898 living in 370 households. It is possible that Office for National Statistics has used incorrect parish boundaries to compile their statistics. The village has had a primary school for many years.  The school used to be called Gaydon Primary School but changed its name to Lighthorne Heath Primary School in the 1990s. Lighthorne Heath is part of the Mid-Fosse parishes  which consist of a benefice of four parishes:  Chesterton, Lighthorne, Moreton Morrell and Ashorne & Newbold Pacey.  The Lighthorne Heath Community Church hold a Cafe Church style service based on the principles of the Fresh Expressions movement.

Governance
The village is in the Westminster parliamentary constituency of Kenilworth and Southam and is represented by Jeremy Paul Wright (Conservative Party) who was elected in the May 2010 general election with 53.6% of the vote. He was re-elected in May 2015 with 58.4% of the total vote on a 76.6% turnout of the electorate. The village is part of the Kineton division of Warwickshire County Council and is represented by Christopher Robin Williams (Conservative Party). He was re-elected on 2 May 2013 with 38.2% of the vote. The village is part of the Harbury ward of Stratford-on-Avon District Council and is represented by Jacqui Harris (Conservative Party). She was elected on 7 May 2015 with 47.0% of the total vote on a 72.4% turnout of the electorate. The Parish council has 5 members; David Booth, David Brewin, Ian Campbell, Carol Crawshay-Newton and Zoe Dandridge-Brown. The next elections are expected in May 2019. The clerk of Lighthorne Heath Parish Council is Mrs Kirsty Buttle.

On 1 April 2020 the parish was renamed from "Lighthorne Heath" to "Upper Lighthorne".

References

External links

Villages in Warwickshire
Stratford-on-Avon District